

D 

 D'Artagnan and Three Musketeers (1978) (TV)
 D’Love (2010)
 D.A.R.Y.L. (1985)
 D.C. Cab (1983)
 D.E.B.S. (2003 & 2004)
 D.I.Y. or Die: How to Survive as an Independent Artist (2002)
 D.O.A. (1950 & 1988)
 D.W. Griffith's 'Abraham Lincoln' (1930)
 D-Day (2013)
 D-Tox (2002)
 D2: The Mighty Ducks (1994)
 D3: The Mighty Ducks (1996)
 DC League of Super-Pets (2022)
 DC Super Hero Girls series:
 DC Super Hero Girls: Super Hero High (2016 TV)
 DC Super Hero Girls: Hero of the Year (2016)
 DC Super Hero Girls: Intergalactic Games (2017)
 Lego DC Super Hero Girls: Brain Drain (2017)
 Lego DC Super Hero Girls: Super-Villain High (2017)
 DC Super Hero Girls: Legends of Atlantis (2018)
 DOA: Dead or Alive (2006)

Da 

 Da (1988)
 Da Game of Life (1998)
 Da grande (1987)
 Da One That Ghost Away (2018)
 Da Possessed (2014)
 Da, smert (2004)
 Da Sweet Blood of Jesus (2014)
 The Da Vinci Code (2006)

Daa

 Daada (1988)
 Daadagiri (1997)
 Daadi Maa (1966)
 Daaera (1953)
 Daag: (1952, 1973 & 1999)
 Daaham (1965)
 Daaka (2019)
 Daaku Aur Jawan (1978)
 Daaman Aur Aag (1973)
 Daana Paani: (1953, 1989 & 2018)
 Daana Veera Soora Karna (1977)
 Daani (2006)
 Daar doer in die bosveld (1951)
 Daari Tappida Maga (1975)
 Daas: (2005 & 2011)
 Daas Dev (2018)
 Daasa (2003)
 Daasi: (1952 & 1988)
 Daata (1989)
 Daava (1997)
 Daayen Ya Baayen (2010)
 Daayraa (1996)

Dab-Dam

 Dabak Daba Aisa (2016)
 Dabang Sarkar (2018)
 Dabangg series:
 Dabangg (2010)
 Dabangg 2 (2012)
 Dabangg 3 (2019)
 Dabbe: Curse of the Jinn (2013)
 Dabbevariki Chedu (1987)
 Dabbu Bhale Jabbu (1992)
 Dabbuki Lokam Dasoham (1973)
 Dachimawa Lee (2008)
 Dad (1989)
 Dad's Army: (1971 & 2016)
 Dada's Dance (2008)
 Dadah is Death (1986)
 Daddy Day Camp (2007)
 Daddy Day Care (2003)
 Daddy Long Legs: (1931, 1938 & 1955)
 Daddy Longlegs (2009)
 Daddy's Home (2015)
 Daddy's Home 2 (2017)
 Daddy's Little Girl (2012)
 Daddy's Little Girls (2007)
 Daddy-Long-Legs: (1919 & 2005)
 Daddy-O (1958)
 Dadnapped (2009 TV)
 Daens (1992)
 Daffy Duck's Fantastic Island (1983)
 Daffy Duck's Quackbusters (1988)
 Daft Punk's Electroma (2006)
 Dagon (2001)
 Dahmer (2002)
 Daimajin (1966)
 Daisies (1966)
 Daisy: (1923, 1988 & 2006)
 Daisy Belle (2018)
 Daisy Kenyon (1947)
 Daisy Winters (2017)
 Dakan (1997)
 Dakota Lil (1950)
 Dalagang Ilocana (1954)
 Dalamarmarangal (2009)
 Daleks - Invasion Earth 2150 AD (1966)
 Dallas Buyers Club (2013)
 The Dallas Connection (1994)
 Daltry Calhoun (2005)
 The Dam Busters (1955)
 Dam Street (2005)
 Damage: (1992, 2009 & 2016)
 Damaged Goods: (1914, 1919 & 1937)
 Damaged Lives (1933)
 Damascus Cover (2017)
 Dames (1934)
 Les Dames du Bois de Boulogne (1945)
 Damien: Omen II (1978)
 Damn Yankees (1958)
 Damnation (1988)
 Damnation Alley (1977)
 The Damned: (1947, 1963, 1969, 2002 & 2013)
 The Damned Don't Cry (1950)
 The Damned United (2009)
 A Damsel in Distress: (1919 & 1937)
 Damsels in Distress (2011)

Dan

 Dan in Real Life (2007)
 Dance of the Dead (2008)
 Dance of Death (1969)
 Dance Flick (2009)
 Dance with Me: (1998, 2019 Iranian & 2019 Japanese)
 Dance Party USA (2006)
 The Dance of Reality (2013)
 Dance with a Stranger (1985)
 Dance with the Wind (2004)
 The Dancer: (1915, 1919, 2000, 2011 & 2016)
 Dancer in the Dark (2000)
 The Dancer Upstairs (2002)
 Dancer, Texas Pop. 81 (1998)
 Dances with Wolves (1990)
 Dancing at the Blue Iguana (2000)
 Dancing with Crime (1947)
 Dancing Lady (1933)
 Dancing at Lughnasa (1998)
 The Dancing Masters (1943)
 Dancing Pirate (1936)
 Dancing Queens (2021)
 Dandelion: (2004 & 2014)
 A Dandy in Aspic (1968)
 Dandy Dick (1935)
 Dang Bireley's and Young Gangsters (1997)
 Danger Lights (1930)
 Danger One (2018)
 Danger on Wheels (1940)
 Danger Within (1959)
 Danger!! Death Ray (1967)
 Danger: Diabolik (1968)
 Dangerous: (1935 & 2021)
 The Dangerous Affair (2015)
 Dangerous Beauty (1998)
 Dangerous Curves (1988)
 Dangerous Game: (1937, 1987, 1993 & 2017)
 The Dangerous Game: (1933 & 1942)
 Dangerous Games (1974) 
 Dangerous to Know (1938)
 Dangerous Liaisons: (1988, 2005 & 2012)
 Dangerous Lies (2020)
 The Dangerous Lives of Altar Boys (2002)
 Dangerous Living: Coming Out in the Developing World (2003)
 A Dangerous Man: Lawrence After Arabia (1990) (TV)
 Dangerous Men (2005)
 A Dangerous Method (2011)
 Dangerous Minds (1995)
 Dangerous Moves (1984)
 Dangerous Parking (2007)
 Daniel: (1983 & 2019)
 Daniel Isn't Real (2019)
 The Danish Girl (2015)
 Danny, the Champion of the World (1989)
 Danny Deckchair (2004)
 Danny Roane: First Time Director (2006)
 Dante's Inferno: (1924, 1935, 1967 & 2007)
 Dante's Peak (1997)
 Danton (1931, 1932 & 1983)

Dar

 Dara of Jasenovac (2021)
 Daraar (1996)
 Darby O'Gill and the Little People (1959)
 Daredevil (2003)
 A Daring Daylight Burglary (1903)
 The Darjeeling Limited (2007)
 The Dark: (1979, 2005 & 2018)
 Dark August (1976)
 Dark Blood (2012)
 Dark Blue (2002)
 Dark Blue World (2001)
 Dark City: (1950 & 1998)
 Dark Command (1940)
 The Dark Corner (1946)
 The Dark Crystal (1982)
 Dark Days (2000)
 The Dark Divide (2020)
 Dark Eyes: (1935, 1951 & 1987)
 The Dark Eyes of London (1939)
 Dark Figure of Crime (2018)
 Dark Floors (2008)
 The Dark Half (1993)
 Dark Harvest: (2004, 2016 & 2023)
 Dark Horse: (1992, 2005 & 2011)
 The Dark Horse: (1932, 1946 & 2014) 
 Dark Horse: The Incredible True Story of Dream Alliance (2015)
 The Dark Hours (2005)
 Dark Intruder (1965)
 The Dark Knight (2008)
 The Dark Knight Rises (2012)
 Dark Mirror: (1984 TV & 2007)
 The Dark Mirror: (1920 & 1946)
 Dark Money (2018)
 Dark Night: (2005 & 2016)
 The Dark Night (1989)
 Dark Is the Night: (1945 & 2017)
 Dark Night of the Scarecrow (1981) (TV)
 Dark Passage (1947)
 Dark Phoenix (2019)
 Dark Secrets (1923)
 Dark Shadows (2012)
 Dark Side of the Moon (2002) (TV)
 Dark Skies: (1929 & 2013)
 Dark Star (1974)
 Dark Summer (2015)
 Dark of the Sun (1968)
 The Dark Tower: (1943 & 2017)
 A Dark Truth (2012)
 Dark Universe (1993)
 Dark Victory (1939)
 Dark Was the Night: (2014 & 2018)
 Dark Water (2002 & 2005)
 Dark Waters (1944, 1994 & 2019)
 Dark Web: Cicada 3301 (2021)
 The Dark and the Wicked (2020)
 Darkest Hour (2017)
 The Darkest Hour (2011)
 Darkman (1990)
 Darkman II: The Return of Durant (1995)
 Darkman III: Die Darkman Die (1996)
 Darkness: (1916, 1923, 1993, 2002 & 2015)
 The Darkness (2016)
 Darkness Falls: (1999 & 2003)
 Darkness Rising (2017)
 Darkness in Tallinn (1993)
 Darkon (2006)
 Darkside Blues (1994)
 Darlin' (2019)
 Darling: (1961, 1965, 2007 Indian, 2007 Swedish, 2010, 2012, 2015 American & 2015 Indian)
 Darling Companion (2012)
 Darling Lili (1970)
 The Darling of Paris: (1917 & 1931)
 The Darwin Awards (2006)
 Darwin's Nightmare (2004)

Das-Daz

 Das Boot (1981)
 Das Experiment (2001)
 Dasepo Naughty Girls (2006)
 Dasvidaniya (2008)
 Date with an Angel (1987)
 A Date with the Falcon (1942)
 A Date with Judy (1948)
 Date Movie (2006)
 Date Night (2010)
 Dating Amber (2020)
 Dating Do's and Don'ts (1949)
 Dating Game Killer (2017) (TV)
 Dau Huduni Methai (2015)
 Daud (1997)
 Daughter of Deceit (1951)
 The Daughter of Dr. Jekyll (1957)
 Daughter of the Dragon (1931)
 Daughter of the East (1924)
 Daughter of the Nile (1987)
 Daughter of the Peaks (1914)
 Daughter of the Wolf (2019)
 Daughters Courageous (1939)
 Daughters of Darkness (1971)
 Daughters of the Dust (1991)
 Dave (1993)
 Dave Chappelle's Block Party (2006)
 Dave Made a Maze (2017)
 David and Bathsheba (1951)
 David Holzman's Diary (1967)
 David and Lisa (1963)
 David Lynch: The Art Life (2016)
 Davy Crockett: (1910 & 1916)
 Davy Crockett: King of the Wild Frontier (1955)
 Dawg (2002)
 Dawn Break Up (2015)
 Dawn Breaks Behind the Eyes (2021)
 Dawn of the Dead: (1978 & 2004)
 The Dawn Patrol: (1930 & 1938)
 Dawn of the Planet of the Apes (2014)
 Dawn Rider (2012)
 The Dawn Rider (1935)
 The Dawns Here Are Quiet: (1972 & 2015)
 Dawson City: Frozen Time (2016)
 The Day After: (1909 & 2017)
 The Day After Tomorrow (2004)
 Day of the Animals (1977)
 A Day at the Beach (1970)
 The Day of the Beast (1995)
 A Day in the Country (1936)
 Day of the Dead (1985 & 2008)
 Day of the Dead 2: Contagium (2005)
 The Day of the Dolphin (1974)
 Day Dreams: (1919 & 1922)
 The Day the Earth Caught Fire (1962)
 The Day the Earth Froze (1959)
 The Day the Earth Stood Still (1951 & 2008)
 Day of the Fight (1951)
 The Day I Became a Woman (2000)
 The Day of the Jackal (1973)
 A Day of Judgment (1981)
 The Day of the Locust (1975)
 Day and Night: (1997, 2004 Chinese, 2004 Swedish & 2010)
 Day for Night (1973)
 Day One: (1989 & 2015)
 Day of the Outlaw (1959)
 The Day a Pig Fell into the Well (1996)
 A Day at the Races (1937)
 The Day the Sky Exploded (1958)
 The Day That Shook the World (1975)
 The Day Time Ended (1980)
 The Day of the Triffids (1963)
 Day Watch (2006)
 The Day Will Dawn (1942)
 A Day Without a Mexican (2004)
 Day the World Ended (1955)
 Day of Wrath (1943)
 A Day's Pleasure (1919)
 Daybreak: (1918, 1931, 1933, 1948, 1993, 2008 & 2017)
 Daybreakers (2009)
 Daydream: (1964 & 1981)
 The Daydreamer (1966)
 Daydreams (1915)
 Daylight: (1996 & 2013)
 Days (2020)
 The Days: (1993 & 2006)
 Days of '36 (1972)
 Days of the Bagnold Summer (2019)
 Days of Being Wild (1991)
 Days of Heaven (1978)
 Days of Our Own (2016)
 Days of Thunder (1990)
 Days of Wine and Roses (1962)
 Days of Youth (1929)
 The Daytrippers (1997)
 Dazed and Confused (1993)

De 

 De Palma (2015)
 De Schippers van de Kameleon (2003)
 De-Lovely (2004)

Dea

 The Dead: (1987 & 2010)
 Dead & Breakfast (2004)
 Dead & Buried (1981)
 Dead Again (1991)
 Dead or Alive: (1921, 1944, 1999 & 2006)
 The Dead Are Alive (1972)
 Dead Bang (1989)
 Dead Before Dawn 3D (2012)
 Dead Birds: (1963 & 2004)
 Dead Calm (1989)
 Dead Cert: (1974 & 2010)
 Dead for a Dollar (2022)
 The Dead Don't Die: (1975 TV & 2019)
 Dead End: (1937 & 2003)
 The Dead Eyes of London (1961)
 The Dead Father (1985)
 Dead Friend (2004)
 The Dead Girl (2006)
 The Dead Hate the Living! (2001)
 Dead in a Heartbeat (2002) (TV)
 Dead Heat: (1988 & 2002)
 Dead Heat on a Merry-Go-Round (1966)
 Dead Man (1995)
 Dead Man on Campus (1998)
 Dead Man Down (2013)
 Dead Man Walking (1995)
 Dead Man's Eyes (1944)
 Dead Man's Letters (1986)
 Dead Man's Shoes: (1940 & 2004)
 Dead Men Don't Wear Plaid (1982)
 Dead Mountaineer's Hotel (1979)
 Dead of Night (1946)
 The Dead One (1961)
 Dead Pigeon on Beethoven Street (1972)
 Dead Pigs (2018)
 Dead Poets Society (1989)
 The Dead Pool (1988)
 Dead Presidents (1995)
 Dead Reckoning (1947)
 Dead Right (1993)
 Dead Ringer (1964)
 Dead Ringers (1988)
 Dead Rising: Watchtower (2015)
 The Dead Room: (2015 & 2018 TV)
 Dead Silence (2007)
 Dead Snow (2009)
 Dead Solid Perfect (1988)
 Dead Time: Kala (2007)
 Dead in the Water (2002)
 Dead in a Week or Your Money Back (2018)
 Dead of Winter (1987)
 The Dead Zone (1983)
 Deadbeat at Dawn (1988)
 Deadfall: (1968, 1993 & 2012)
 Deadful Melody (1994)
 Deadgirl (2008)
 Deadlier Than the Male (1966)
 The Deadliest Season (1977) (TV)
 Deadline: (1948, 1980, 1987, 2001, 2009 & 2012)
 Deadline - U.S.A. (1952)
 Deadline at Dawn (1946)
 A Deadly Adoption (2015) (TV)
 The Deadly Affair (1966)
 The Deadly Bees (1966)
 Deadly Blessing (1981)
 The Deadly Companions (1961)
 Deadly Drifter (1982)
 Deadly Eyes (1982)
 Deadly Friend (1986)
 Deadly Games (1989)
 Deadly Harvest: (1972 TV & 1977)
 Deadly Illusions (2021)
 The Deadly Mantis: (1957 & 1978)
 A Deadly Secret (1980)
 The Deadly Spawn (1983)
 Deadly Strangers (1974)
 The Deadly Tower (1975) (TV)
 Deadpool (2016)
 Deadpool 2 (2018)
 Deadstream (2022)
 Deadtime Stories (1986)
 Deadwood: The Movie (2019) (TV)
 Deaf Smith & Johnny Ears (1973)
 The Deal: (1983, 2003 TV, 2005, 2008 & 2015)
 Deal of the Century (1983)
 Dear America: Letters Home from Vietnam (1987)
 Dear Brigitte (1965)
 Dear Comrades! (2020)
 Dear Diary (1993)
 Dear Doctor (2009)
 Dear Enemy (2011)
 Dear Evan Hansen (2021)
 Dear Frankie (2004)
 Dear God (1996)
 Dear Jesse (1998)
 Dear John: (1964 & 2010)
 Dear Mr. Brody (2021)
 Dear Murderer (1947)
 Dear Wendy (2005)
 Dear White People (2014)
 Dear Zachary: A Letter to a Son About His Father (2008)
 Dear, Don't Be Afraid (2015)
 Dearest Sister (2016)
 Death to 2020 (2020)
 Death to 2021 (2021)
 Death Becomes Her (1992)
 Death Bed: The Bed That Eats (1977)
 Death Bell (2008)
 Death in Brunswick (1990)
 The Death Collector (1976)
 Death and the Compass (1996)
 Death of a Corrupt Man (1977)
 Death of a Cyclist (1955)
 Death Defying Acts (2007)
 Death from a Distance (1935)
 Death Duel (1977)
 Death of a Dynasty (2003)
 Death Force (1978)
 Death at a Funeral: (2007 & 2010)
 Death Game (1977)
 Death in the Garden (1956)
 Death in Gaza (2004)
 Death Hunt: (1977 & 1981)
 Death Knocks Twice (1969)
 Death of a Ladies' Man (2020)
 Death Line (1972)
 The Death of Louis XIV (2016)
 Death Machine (1994)
 Death and the Maiden (1995)
 Death of Me (2020)
 The Death of Mr. Lazarescu (2005)
 Death of a Nation: (1994 & 2018)
 Death on the Nile: (1978 & 2022)
 The Death Note (2016)
 Death Note series:
 Death Note: (2006 & 2017)
 Death Note 2: The Last Name (2006)
 L: Change the World (2008)
 Death Note: Light Up the New World (2016)
 Death of a Poetess (2017)
 Death of a President: (1977 & 2006)
 Death Proof (2007)
 Death Race: (1973 TV & 2008)
 Death Race 2 (2011)
 Death Race 2000 (1975)
 Death Rides a Horse (1967)
 Death Ring (1992)
 Death of a Salesman: (1951 & 1985)
 Death of a Scoundrel (1956)
 Death Sentence: (1968, 1974 & 2007) 
 Death Ship (1980)
 The Death Ship (1959)
 Death to Smoochy (2002)
 Death of a Soldier (1986)
 Death Spa (1989)
 The Death of Stalin (2017)
 The Death of Superman (2018)
 Death to the Supermodels (2005)
 Death Takes a Holiday: (1934 & 1971 TV)
 Death Trip: (1967, 2014 & 2015)
 Death Tunnel (2005)
 Death in Venice (1971)
 Death of a Vlogger (2019)
 Death Watch (1980)
 The Death Wheelers (1974)
 Death Wish series:
 Death Wish: (1974 & 2018)
 Death Wish II (1982)
 Death Wish 3 (1985)
 Death Wish 4: The Crackdown (1987)
 Death Wish V: The Face of Death (1994)
 Death, Deceit and Destiny Aboard the Orient Express (2000)
 The Deathday Party (2014)
 Deathdream (1974)
 Deathlands: Homeward Bound (2003)
 Deathrow (2000)
 The Deaths of Ian Stone (2007)
 Deathstalker (1984)
 Deathstalker and the Warriors from Hell (1988)
 Deathtrap (1982)
 Deathwatch: (1965 & 2002)

Deb-Dej

 Debbie Does Dallas (1978)
 The Debt: (1917, 1993, 1997, 1999, 2003 TV, 2007, 2010, 2014 & 2015)
 The Decameron (1971)
 Deceit: (1923, 1932, 1989, 1999, 2004 TV & 2009)
 Deceived (1991)
 Deceiver (1997)
 The Deceiver (1931)
 The Deceivers (1988)
 December Heat (2008)
 Deception: (1946 & 2008)
 Deception Obsession (2015)
 Decision Before Dawn (1951)
 Decision to Leave (2022)
 Deck Dogz (2005)
 Deck the Halls (2006)
 The Decline (2020)
 The Decline of the American Empire (1986)
 Deconstructing Harry (1997)
 Decoys (2004)
 Dedication (2006)
 Deep: (2005, 2017 & 2021)
 The Deep: (1977, 2012 & unfinished)
 Deep Blue Sea series:
 Deep Blue Sea (1999)
 Deep Blue Sea 2 (2018)
 Deep Blue Sea 3 (2020)
 The Deep Blue Sea: (1955 & 2011)
 Deep Cover (1992)
 Deep Crimson (1996)
 Deep End (1970)
 The Deep End (2001)
 The Deep End of the Ocean (1999)
 Deep Impact (1998)
 Deep Red (1976)
 Deep Rising (1998)
 Deep River (1995)
 Deep Sea (2023)
 Deep Sea 3D (2006)
 Deep Sea Beast Reigo (2005)
 Deep Shock (2003) (TV)
 Deep Throat (1972)
 Deep Water: (2006 & 2022)
 Deep Waters: (1920 & 1948)
 Deep in the Woods (2000)
 Deepstar Six (1989)
 Deepwater Horizon (2016)
 The Deer (1974)
 The Deer Hunter (1978)
 Deerskin (2019)
 Deewaar (1975)
 Deewane Tere Pyar Ke (1998)
 Def Jam's How to Be a Player (1997)
 Def by Temptation (1990)
 Def-Con 4 (1985)
 Defence of Sevastopol (1911)
 Defending Your Life (1991)
 Defendor (2010)
 Defiance: (1980 & 2008)
 The Defiant Ones: (1958 & 1986 TV)
 Definitely, Maybe (2008)
 Déjà Vu (1985, 1990, 1997, 2006 & 2015)

Dek–Del

 Dek hor (2006)
 Dekada '70 (2002)
 Dekala Purudu Kenek (2019)
 DeKalb Elementary (2017)
 Dekalog (1988)
 Dekh Bhai Dekh (2009)
 Dekh Kabira Roya (1957)
 Dekh Kemon Lage (2017)
 Dekh Magar Pyaar Say (2015)
 Dekh Tamasha Dekh (2014)
 Dekha (2001)
 Dekha, Na-Dekhay (2013)
 Dekha Pyar Tumhara (1985)
 Delayed Action (1954)
 Deldadeh (2008)
 Delete My Love (2014)
 Delgo (2006)
 Delhi-6 (2009)
 Delhi Belly (2011)
 Delhi in a Day (2011)
 Delhi Mapillai (1968)
 Delhi Mellei (2014)
 Delhii Heights (2007)
 Deli Yürek: Bumerang Cehennemi (2001)
 Delicacy (2011)
 The Delicate Delinquent (1957)
 Delicate Sound of Thunder (1989)
 Delicatessen: (1930 & 1991)
 Deliciosa Sinvergüenza (1990)
 Delicious (1931)
 The Delicious Little Devil (1919)
 Deliciously Amoral (1969)
 Delighted by You (1958)
 Delightful Dolly (1910)
 Delightful Forest (1972)
 Delightful Story (1936)
 Delightfully Dangerous (1945)
 Delinquent Daughters (1944)
 The Delinquents: (1957, 1960 & 1989)
 Delirio (1944)
 Delirious: (1991 & 2006)
 Delirium: (1979, 1987, 2013, 2014 & 2018)
 Delito (1962)
 Delitti e profumi (1988)
 Delitto a Porta Romana (1980)
 Delitto al luna park (1952) 
 Delitto passionale (1994)
 Delitto sull'autostrada (1982)
 Deliver Us from Eva (2003)
 Deliver Us from Evil: (1969, 1973 TV, 2006, 2009, 2014 & 2020)
 Deliverance (1919 & 1972)
 Deliverance Creek (2014 TV)
 Delivered (1999)
 Delivering Milo (2001)
 Delivery (2005)
 Delivery Boys (1984)
 Delivery Man (2013)
 Delizia (1987)
 Della (1964)
 Dellamorte Dellamore (1994)
 Delphinium: A Childhood Portrait of Derek Jarman (2009)
 Delta Blues (2001)
 Delta Boys (2016)
 Delta Farce (2007)
 The Delta Force (1986)
 Delta Force 2: The Colombian Connection (1990)
 Delta Force 3: The Killing Game (1991)
 Delta Force Commando (1988)
 Delta Heat (1992)
 Delta of Venus (1994)
 Deluge (1933)
 The Deluge (1974)
 Delusion: (1955, 1980, 1991, 1998 & 2016)
 Delusions (2005)
 Delusion of Grandeur (1971)

Dem-Der

 Demain à Nanguila (1969)
 Demented (1980)
 Demented Death Farm Massacre (1971)
 Dementia: (1955 & 2014)
 Dementia 13: (1963 & 2017)
 Demetrius and the Gladiators (1954)
 Demi Cinta Belahlah Dadaku (1991)
 Demi-Gods and Semi-Devils (1982)
 The Demi-Paradise (1943)
 Demi Ucok (2013)
 Demolishing and Building Up the Star Theatre (1901)
 Demolition High (1996)
 Demolition Man (1993)
 The Demon: (1918, 1926, 1978 & 1981)
 Demon Island (2002)
 Demon Knight (1995)
 Demon Seed (1977)
 Demon Slayer: Kimetsu no Yaiba – The Movie: Mugen Train (2020)
 Demon Under Glass (2002)
 Demonia (1990)
 Demonic Toys (1993)
 Demonic Toys 2 (2010) 
 Demonlover (2002)
 Demons (1985)
 Demons 2 (1986)
 The Demons of Ludlow (1983)
 Den (2001)
 The Den (2013)
 Den Brother (2010)
 Denial: (1990, 1998 & 2016)
 Denise Calls Up (1995)
 Denko (1993)
 Dennis the Menace (1993)
 Dennis the Menace Strikes Again (1998)
 The Dentist (1996)
 The Dentist 2: Brace Yourself (1998)
 Dentist in the Chair (1960)
 Dentist on the Job (1961)
 The Departed (2006)
 The Departure: (1967 & 2017)
 Departure: (1931 & 1986)
 Departure of a Grand Old Man (1912)
 Departures: (2008 & 2011)
 Deported (1950)
 Der Blaue Engel (1930)
 Der Fuehrer's Face (1943)
 Der müde Tod (1921)
 Der Schuh des Manitu (2001)
 Der Sieg des Glaubens (1933)
 Der Untergang (2004)
 Derailed (2002 & 2005)
 Deranged: Confessions of a Necrophile (1974)
 The Derby (1895)
 Derek and Clive Get the Horn (1979)
 Le Dernier Combat (The Last Battle) (1984)
 Derrida (2002)
 Dersu Uzala: (1961 & 1975)

Des

 Descendants series:
 Descendants (2015 TV)
 Descendants 2 (2017 TV)
 Descendants 3 (2019 TV)
 The Descendants (2011)
 Descent: (2005 TV & 2007)
 The Descent (2005)
 The Descent: Part 2 (2009)
 Desecration (1999)
 Desert Blue (1998)
 The Desert Fox: The Story of Rommel (1951)
 Desert Fury (1947)
 The Desert Island (1936)
 The Desert Rats (1953)
 The Desert Song: (1929, 1943 & 1953)
 Desierto (2015)
 Design for Living (1933)
 The Designated Victim (1971)
 Designing Woman (1957)
 Designing Women (1934)
 Desire: (1920, 1921, 1923, 1936, 1946, 1958, 1982, 2000 & 2017)
 The Desire: (1944 & 2010)
 Desire Me (1947)
 The Desired Woman (1927)
 Désirée (1954)
 Desk Set (1957)
 Desperado (1995)
 The Desperadoes (1943)
 The Desperados Are in Town (1956)
 Desperate (1947)
 Desperate Hours (1990)
 The Desperate Hours: (1955 & 1967 TV)
 Desperate Journey (1942)
 Desperate Justice (1993 TV)
 Desperate Lives (1982 TV)
 Desperate Living (1977)
 Desperate for Love (1989 TV)
 Desperate Measures (1998)
 Desperate Mission (1965)
 The Desperate Mission (1969)
 Desperate Moment (1953)
 Desperate Poaching Affray (1903)
 Desperate Remedies (1993)
 Desperate Rescue: The Cathy Mahone Story (1993 TV)
 Desperate Search (1952)
 Desperate Teenage Lovedolls (1984)
 The Desperate Trail (1994 TV)
 Desperate Trails: (1921 & 1939)
 Desperately Seeking Helen (1998)
 Desperately Seeking Santa (2011 TV)
 Desperately Seeking Susan (1985)
 Desperation Boulevard (1998)
 Despicable Me series:
 Despicable Me (2010)
 Despicable Me 2 (2013)
 Despicable Me 3 (2017)
 Despite the Falling Snow (2016)
 Despite the Night (2015)
 Despoinis eton 39 (1954)
 Después de la tormenta (1990)
 Después del silencio (1956)
 Desserts (1998)
 Destination 60,000 (1957)
 Destination Anywhere (1997)
 Destination: Dewsbury (2018)
 Destination: Infestation (2007 TV)
 Destination Moon (1950)
 Destination Tokyo (1943)
 Destination Wedding (2018)
 Destino (2003)
 Destiny: (1921, 1942, 1944, 1977, 1997 & 2006)
 Destiny: Or, The Soul of a Woman (1915)
 Destroy All Monsters (1968)
 Destry Rides Again (1939)
 Desyat Negrityat (1987)

Det-Dew

 Detachment (2012)
 Detainment (2018)
 Detective: (1954, 1958, 1979, 1985, 2007 & 2020)
 The Detective: (1968 & 2007)
 Detective Chinatown (2015)
 Detective Conan series:
 Detective Conan: Captured in Her Eyes (2000)
 Detective Conan: Countdown to Heaven (2001)
 Detective Conan: Crimson Love Letter (2017)
 Detective Conan: Crossroad in the Ancient Capital (2003)
 Detective Conan: Dimensional Sniper (2014)
 Detective Conan: The Eleventh Striker (2012)
 Detective Conan: The Fourteenth Target (1998)
 Detective Conan: Full Score of Fear (2008)
 Detective Conan: Jolly Roger in the Deep Azure (2007)
 Detective Conan: The Last Wizard of the Century (1999)
 Detective Conan: The Lost Ship in the Sky (2010)
 Detective Conan: Magician of the Silver Sky (2004)
 Detective Conan: The Phantom of Baker Street (2002)
 Detective Conan: Private Eye in the Distant Sea (2013)
 Detective Conan: The Private Eyes' Requiem (2006)
 Detective Conan: Quarter of Silence (2011)
 Detective Conan: The Raven Chaser (2009)
 Detective Conan: Strategy Above the Depths (2005)
 Detective Conan: The Time-Bombed Skyscraper (1997)
 Detective Dee: The Four Heavenly Kings (2018)
 Detective Dee and the Mystery of the Phantom Flame (2010)
 Detective Gui (2015)
 Detective Knight: Independence (2023)
 Detective Knight: Redemption (2022)
 Detective Knight: Rogue (2022)
 Detective Pikachu (2019)
 Detective Story: (1951, 1983 & 2007)
 Detention: (2003, 2010, 2011 & 2019)
 Deterrence (1999)
 Detour: (1945, 1967, 2009 Canadian, 2009 Norwegian, 2013 & 2016)
 Detours (2016)
 Detroit Rock City (1999)
 Deuce Bigalow: European Gigolo (2005)
 Deuce Bigalow: Male Gigolo (1999)
 Deuces Wild (2002)
 Deuljwi (1927)
 Le deuxième souffle (1966)
 Dev: (2004 & 2019)
 Dev Son of Mudde Gowda (2012)
 Dev.D (2009)
 Deva: (1989, 1995, 2002 & 2017)
 Deva Maanava (1966)
 Deva Sundari (1957)
 Devaalayam (1964)
 Devaasuram (1993)
 Devadas: (1989 & 2018)
 Devdas: (1935, 1955, 2002 Hindi & 2002 Bengali)
 Devadasi (1948)
 Devadasu: (1953, 1974 & 2006)
 Devadasu Malli Puttadu (1978)
 Devadoothan (2000)
 Devakanya (1943)
 Devaki: (1951, 2005 & 2019)
 Devalokam (unreleased)
 Devan (2002)
 Devanthakudu: (1960 & 1984)
 Devar (1966)
 Devara Duddu (1977)
 Devara Gedda Manava (1967)
 Devara Gudi (1975)
 Devara Kannu (1975)
 Devara Maga (2000)
 Devara Makkalu (1970)
 Devara Naadalli (2016)
 Devaraagam (1996)
 Devarattam (2019)
 Devaraya (2012)
 Devaru Bekagiddare (2019)
 Devaru Kotta Thangi: (1973 & 2009)
 Devaru Kotta Vara (1976)
 Devasthanam (2012)
 Devasundari (1962)
 Devata: (1941, 1965 & 1978)
 Devatha: (1965 & 1982)
 Devatha Manushya (1988)
 Devathai (1997)
 Devathaiyai Kanden (2005)
 Devathalara Deevinchandi (1977)
 Devdas: (1928, 1935, 1936, 1937, 1955, 1965, 1979, 1982, 2002 Bengali, 2002 Hindi & 2013)
 Devdoot (2005)
 Developing (1994)
 Deveni Gamana (1982)
 Deveni Warama (2016)
 Devi: (1960, 1970, 1972, 1999, 2016 & 2020)
 Devi 2 (2019)
 Devi Dharisanam (1980)
 Devi Kanyakumari (1974)
 Devi Putrudu (2001)
 Deviant (2018)
 Deviant Love (2019)
 Deviation (2006)
 The Devil: (1908, 1915, 1918 & 1972)
 Devil: (2010 & 2011)
 The Devil All the Time (2020)
 Devil and Angel (2015)
 The Devil Bat (1940)
 Devil in a Blue Dress (1995)
 The Devil in a Convent (1899)
 The Devil and Daniel Johnston (2006)
 The Devil and Daniel Webster (1941)
 Devil Doll (1964)
 Devil Fish (1986)
 Devil in the Flesh (1947, 1986 & 1998)
 Devil in the Flesh 2 (2000)
 Devil Girl from Mars (1954)
 The Devil Inside (2012)
 The Devil in Love (1966)
 The Devil and Max Devlin (1981)
 Devil May Call (2013)
 The Devil and Miss Jones (1941)
 The Devil Probably (1977)
 Devil Riders (1943)
 The Devil Rides Out (1968)
 The Devil Strikes at Night (1957)
 The Devil by the Tail (1969)
 The Devil Wears Prada (2006)
 The Devil Is a Woman: (1935, 1950 & 1974)
 A Devil of a Woman (1951)
 The Devil-Doll (1936)
 The Devil's Advocate: (1977 & 1997)
 Devil's Angels (1967)
 The Devil's Backbone (2001)
 Devil's Bait (1959)
 The Devil's Brigade (1968)
 The Devil's Brother (1933)
 The Devil's Candy (2015)
 The Devil's Daughter: (1915, 1939, 1973 TV & 1991)
 Devil's Diary (2007 TV)
 Devil's Doorway (1950)
 The Devil's Double (2011)
 The Devil's Game (2008)
 Devil's Gate: (2004 & 2017)
 The Devil's General (1955)
 The Devil’s Knot (2013)
 Devil's Night: Dawn of the Nain Rouge (2019)
 The Devil’s Mercy (2008)
 The Devil's Nightmare (1971)
 The Devil's Own (1997)
 The Devil's Party (1938)
 The Devil's Pass (2013)
 Devil's Playground: (2002 & 2010)
 The Devil's Playground: (1928, 1937, 1946 & 1976)
 Devil's Pond (2003)
 The Devil's Rain (1975)
 The Devil's Rejects (2005)
 The Devil's Tomb (2009)
 The Devil's Trail (1919)
 The Devil's Trap (1962)
 The Devil's Wheel (1926)
 A Devilish Homicide (1965)
 Devilman (2004)
 The Devils (1971)
 Devils on the Doorstep (2000)
 The Devonsville Terror (1983)
 Devotion: (1921, 1929, 1931, 1946, 1950, 1954 & 2022)
 Devour (2005)
 Dewan Bahadur (1943)

Dh

 Dha Dha 87 (2019)
 Dhaakad (2022)
 Dhaal (1997)
 Dhaam Dhoom (2008)
 Dhaasippen (1943)
 Dhada (2011)
 Dhadak (2018)
 Dhadakebaaz (1990)
 Dhadkan (1946, 2000 & 2017)
 Dhag (2012)
 Dhai Akshar Prem Ke (2000)
 Dhai Chaal (TBD)
 Dhairyam: (2005 & 2017)
 Dhairyavanthudu (1986)
 Dhaka Attack (2017)
 Dhakaiya Mastan (2002)
 Dhakam (1972)
 Dhake Ki Malmal (1956)
 Dhalinyaro (2017)
 Dhee (2007)
 Dheem Tharikida Thom (1986)
 Dheeme Dheeme (2009)
 Dheena (2001)
 Dheepam (1977)
 Dheepan (2015)
 Dheera (1982)
 Dheeran (1987)
 Dheerasameere Yamuna Theere (1977)
 Dheerga Sumangali (1974)
 Dheevaanaa (2001)
 Dheewarayo (1964)
 Dheewari (2011)
 Dhefirin (1997)
 Dhehithehge Loabi (1995)
 Dheivatheyorthu (1985)
 Dheriyaa (1994)
 Dhevana An'bi (1994)
 Dhevansoora (2018)
 Dhh (2017)
 Dhikku Theriyadha Kaattil (1972)
 Dhilakani (2013)
 Dhill (2001)
 Dhilluku Dhuddu (2016)
 Dhilluku Dhuddu 2 (2019)
 Dhin Veynuge Hithaamaigaa (2010)
 Dhinamdhorum (1998)
 Dhinamum Ennai Gavani (1997)
 Dhinarathrangal (1988)
 Dhobi Doctor (1954)
 Dhobi Ghat (2010)
 Dhol (2007)
 Dhol Taashe (2015)
 Dhon Manma (1992)
 Dhoni (2012)
 Dhoni Kabadi Kuzhu (2018)
 Dhonkamana (2003)
 Dhool: (2003 & 2011)
 Dhool Ka Phool (1959)
 Dhool Parakuthu (1993)
 Dhoom series:
 Dhoom (2004)
 Dhoom 2 (2006)
 Dhoom 3 (2013)
 Dhoom Dadakka (2008)
 Dhoom Dhadaka (1985)
 Dhoomakethu (1968)
 Dhoomketu (1949)
 Dhoon (1953)
 Dhoondte Reh Jaaoge (2009)
 Dhoondte Reh Jaaoge! (1998)
 Dhoop (2003)
 Dhoop Chhaon: (1935 & 1977)
 Dhoorathu Pachai (1987)
 Dhosth (2001)
 Dhrohi (1982)
 Dhruva: (2002 & 2016)
 Dhruvam (1993)
 Dhruvasangamam (1981)
 Dhuan (1981)
 Dhuandhaar (2021)
 Dhuen Ki Lakeer (1974)
 Dhuin (2022)
 Dhumah Eri Thari (2001)
 Dhumketu (2016)
 Dhumkkudiya (2019)
 Dhumm (2002)
 Dhund: (1973 & 2003)
 Dhunki (2019)
 Dhurala (2020)
 Dhuusar (2020)
 Dhwani (1988)
 Dhwaja (2018)
 Dhyaas Parva (2001)

Di-Dj

 Le Diable boiteux (1948; tr. The Lame Devil)
 The Diabolic Tenant (1909)
 Diabolique (1996)
 Les Diaboliques (1955)
 Dial M for Murder (1954)
 The Diamond (1954)
 Diamond Men (2000)
 The Diamond Necklace (1921)
 Diamonds: (1920, 1937, 1939, 1947, 1975 & 1999)
 Diamonds Are Forever (1971)
 Diamonds of the Night (1964)
 Diane: (1929, 1956 & 2018)
 Diao Chan (1938)
 Diary: (1983, 1997 & 2006)
 The Diary of Anne Frank: (1959, 1967 TV & 1980 TV)
 Diary of a Chambermaid: (1964 & 2015)
 The Diary of a Chambermaid (1946)
 Diary of a Country Priest (1951)
 Diary of the Dead (2007)
 Diary of June (2005)
 Diary of a Lost Girl (1929)
 Diary of a Mad Black Woman (2005)
 Diary of a Mad Housewife (1970)
 Diary of a Madman (1963)
 Diary for My Children (1984)
 Diary for My Lovers (1987)
 Diary for My Mother and Father (1990)
 Diary of a Nymphomaniac (2008)
 A Diary for Timothy (1945)
 The Diary of a Teenage Girl (2015)
 Diary of a Wimpy Kid series:
 Diary of a Wimpy Kid (2010)
 Diary of a Wimpy Kid: Rodrick Rules (2011)
 Diary of a Wimpy Kid: Dog Days (2012)
 Diary of a Wimpy Kid: The Long Haul (2017)
 Dick (1999)
 Dick Figures (2011)
 Dick Johnson Is Dead (2020)
 Dick Tracy: (1945 & 1990)
 Dick Tracy vs. Cueball (1946)
 Dick Tracy Meets Gruesome (1947)
 Dick Tracy's Dilemma (1947)
 Dickie Roberts: Former Child Star (2003)
 The Dickson Experimental Sound Film (1894)
 Dickson Greeting (1891)
 The Dictator (1935 & 2012)
 Did You Hear About the Morgans? (2009)
 Die Another Day (2002)
 Die Bad (2000)
 Die Hard series:
 Die Hard (1988)
 Die Hard 2 (1990)
 Die Hard with a Vengeance (1995)
 Live Free or Die Hard (2007)
 A Good Day to Die Hard (2013)
 Die Sehnsucht der Veronika Voss (1982)
 Die, Mommie, Die! (2003)
 Dieu est grand, je suis toute petite (2001)
 Different for Girls (1996)
 Different From The Others (1919)
 Difret (2014)
 DiG! (2004)
 The Dig (2021)
 Digger: (1993 & 2020)
 Diggers: (1931 & 2006)
 Diggstown (1992)
 "DigitalLivesMatter" (2016)
 Digimon: The Movie (2000)
 Digna... hasta el último aliento (2003)
 Dil Aashna Hai (1992)
 The Dilemma: (1914 & 2011)
 Dilili in Paris (2018)
 Dillinger: (1945, 1960 TV, 1973 & 1991 TV)
 Dillinger Is Dead (1969)
 Diner: (1982 & 2019)
 Dingjun Mountain (1905)
 Dingo (1991)
 The Dingo (1923)
 The Dinner: (1998, 2013, 2014 & 2017)
 Dinner for Adele (1977)
 Dinner in America (2020)
 Dinner at Eight: (1933 & 1989 TV)
 The Dinner Game (1999)
 Dinner Rush (2002)
 Dinner for Schmucks (2010)
 Dinner Time (1928)
 Dino Time (2012)
 Dinosaur (2000)
 Dinosaur 13 (2013)
 Dinosaurus! (1960)
 Diplomacy: (1916, 1926 & 2014)
 Director's Cut (2016)
 Dirigible (1931)
 Dirt: (1994 & 1998)
 Dirt! The Movie (2009)
 Dirty Dancing: (1987 & 2017)
 Dirty Dancing: Havana Nights (2004)
 Dirty Deeds (2002 & 2005)
 Dirty Dingus Magee (1970)
 The Dirty Dozen (1967)
 Dirty Duck (1974)
 Dirty Grandpa (2016)
 Dirty Harry (1971)
 Dirty Laundry: (2006 & 2012)
 Dirty Little Billy (1972)
 Dirty Love (2005)
 Dirty Mary, Crazy Larry (1974)
 The Dirty Picture (2011)
 Dirty Pretty Things (2002)
 Dirty Rotten Scoundrels (1988)
 A Dirty Shame (2004)
 Dirty Weekend: (1973, 1993 & 2015)
 Dirty Work: (1933, 1934 & 1998)
 The Disappearance of Alice Creed (2009)
 Disappearance at Clifton Hill (2019)
 The Disappeared: (2008 & 2012)
 Disappearing Acts (2000)
 The Disappointments Room (2016)
 The Disaster Artist (2017)
 Disaster Movie (2008)
 Disciples of the 36th Chamber (1985)
 Disciples of Hippocrates  (1980)
 Disclosure: (1994 & 2020)
 Disclosure: Trans Lives on Screen (2020)
 Disco Beaver from Outer Space (1979)
 Disco Dancer (1982)
 Disco Godfather (1980)
 Disconnect: (2012 & 2018)
 Disconnected: (1984 & 2021)
 The Discovery (2017)
 Discreet (2017)
 The Discreet Charm of the Bourgeoisie (1972)
 Disenchanted (2022)
 The Dish (2000)
 Dishonored (1931)
 Dishonored Lady (1947)
 Dismissed (2017)
 Disney Princess Enchanted Tales: Follow Your Dreams (2007)
 Disney's The Kid (2000)
 Disobedience (2017)
 The Disorderly Orderly (1964)
 Disorganized Crime (1989)
 Disraeli (1916, 1921 & 1929)
 Distance: (2001 & 2015)
 Distant (2002)
 Distant Drums (1951)
 Distant Lights: (1987 & 2003)
 Distant Thunder: (1973 & 1988)
 Distant Voices, Still Lives (1988)
 The Distinguished Gentleman (1992)
 District 9 (2009)
 District B13 (2004)
 Disturbia (2007)
 Disturbing Behavior (1998)
 Ditto (1937 & 2000)
 Diva (1981)
 Divan (2004)
 Dive Bomber (1941)
 Divergent (2014)
 The Divide (2012)
 Divide and Conquer (1943)
 The Divided Heart (1954)
 Divided We Fall (2000)
 Divine (1935)
 The Divine Comedy (1991)
 Divine Intervention (2002)
 Divine Madness! (1980)
 Divine Secrets of the Ya-Ya Sisterhood (2002)
 The Divine Weapon (2008)
 The Diving Bell and the Butterfly (2007)
 Il divo: La spettacolare vita di Giulio Andreotti (2008)
 Le Divorce (2003)
 Divorce Italian Style (1961)
 The Divorce of Lady X (1938)
 The Divorcee (1930)
 Divorcing Jack (1998)
 Dixie (1943)
 Dixie Chicks: Shut Up and Sing (2006)
 Dixie Days (1930)
 Dixie Dugan (1943)
 Dixie Dynamite (1976)
 Dixie Land (2015)
 Dixieland (2015)
 Django: (1966 & 2017)
 Django Strikes Again (1987)
 Django Unchained (2012)
 Django, Prepare a Coffin (1968)
 The Djinn (2021)

Do

 Do Aankhen (1974)
 Do Aankhen Barah Haath (1957)
 Do Anjaane (1976)
 Do Ankhen Barah Hath (1997)
 Do Ansoo (1950)
 Do Aur Do Paanch (1980)
 Do Bachche Dus Haath (1972)
 Do Badan (1966)
 Do Be Quick (1977)
 Do Bhai: (1947 & 1969)
 Do Bigha Zameen (1953)
 Do Boond Pani (1971)
 Do Chattane (1974)
 Do Chehere (1977)
 Do Chor (1972)
 Do Communists Have Better Sex? (2006)
 Do Detectives Think? (1927)
 Do Dilon Ki Dastaan: (1966 & 1985)
 Do Dishayen (1982)
 Do Diwane (1936)
 Do Dooni Chaar: (1968 & 2010)
 Do Dooni Panj (2019)
 Do Fantoosh (1994)
 Do Fish Do It? (2002)
 Do Gaz Zameen Ke Neeche (1972)
 Do Hanso Ka Joda (1992)
 Do I Exist: A Riddle (2019)
 Do I Have to Kill My Child? (1976)
 Do I Have to Take Care of Everything? (2012)
 Do I Sound Gay? (2014)
 Do It Again (2010)
 Do It for Johnny (2007)
 Do It Like an Hombre (2017)
 Do It Now (1924)
 Do It — One! (1990)
 Do Jasoos (1975)
 Do Jhoot (1975)
 Do Kaliyaan (1968)
 Do Khiladi (1976)
 Do Knot Disturb (2009)
 Do Lachhian (1960)
 Do Ladke Dono Kadke (1979)
 Do Ladkiyan (1976)
 Do Lado de Fora (2014)
 Do Lafzon Ki Kahani (2016)
 Do Mastane (1958)
 Do Matwale (1991)
 Do Men Love Women? (1912)
 Do Musafir (1978)
 Do Nambar Ke Amir (1974)
 Do Not Disturb: (1965, 1999, 2010, 2012, 2014 & 2016)
 Do Not Erase (2006)
 Do Not Fall in New York City (2012)
 Do Not Fold, Spindle or Mutilate (1971)
 Do Not Fold, Staple, Spindle or Mutilate (1967)
 Do Not Forget Me Istanbul (2011)
 Do Not Go Gentle (2002)
 Do Not Hesitate (2021)
 Do Not Marry, Girls (1985)
 Do Not Part with Your Beloved (1980)
 Do Not Send Your Wife to Italy (1960)
 Do Not Shoot at White Swans (1980)
 Do Not Split (2020)
 Do Paise Ki Dhoop, Chaar Aane Ki Baarish (2009)
 Do Pal (1991)
 Do Revenge (2022)
 Do the Right Thing (1989)
 "#DoYouThinkIAmSexy" (2022)
 Do You See Me? (2014)

Doa-Dow

 DOA: Dead or Alive (2006)
 Dobaara: See Your Evil (2017)
 Dobermann (1997)
 Doc (1971)
 Doc Hollywood (1991)
 Doc Savage: The Man of Bronze (1975)
 Docking the Boat (1965)
 Docks of New York (1945)
 The Docks of New York (1928)
 Doctor Detroit (1983)
 Doctor Dolittle (1967)
 Doctor Dracula (1978)
 Doctor Faustus: (1967 & 1982)
 Doctor in the House (1954)
 Doctor Lisa (2020)
 Doctor Sleep: (2002 & 2019)
Doctor Strange series:
 Doctor Strange: (1978 & 2016)
 Doctor Strange in the Multiverse of Madness (2022)
 Doctor Strange: The Sorcerer Supreme (2007)
 Doctor Who (1996 TV)
 Doctor X (1932)
 Doctor Zhivago (1965)
 A Doctor's Diary (1937)
 The Doctor's Dilemma (1958)
 Dodesukaden (1970)
 Dodge City (1939)
 Dodgeball: A True Underdog Story (2004)
 Dodsworth (1936)
 Dog: (2001 & 2022)
 The Dog: (1992 & 2013)
 Dog Day (1984)
 Dog Day Afternoon (1975)
 Dog Days: (1925, 1970, 2001 & 2018)
 Dog Days of Summer (2007)
 A Dog in a Drawer (1982)
 Dog Eat Dog: (1964, 2001, 2008, 2016 & 2018)
 A Dog of Flanders: (1935, 1959 & 1999)
 Dog Park (1998)
 Dog Pound (2010)
 Dog Pounded (1954)
 Dog Soldiers (2002)
 Dog Star Man (1961)
 The Dog Who Stopped the War (1984)
 The Dog Who Wouldn't Be Quiet (2021)
 A Dog's Journey (2019)
 A Dog's Life (1918)
 A Dog's Purpose (2017)
 A Dog's Will (2000)
 Dogfight (1991)
 Dogma (1999)
 Dogs: (1976 & 2016)
 The Dogs (1979)
 Dogs Don't Wear Pants (2019)
 Dogs in Space (1987)
 Dogs of War (1923)
 The Dogs of War (1980)
 Dogtooth (2009)
 Dogtown (1997)
 Dogtown and Z-Boys (2001)
 Dogville (2003)
 Doing Time for Patsy Cline (1997)
 Dolan’s Cadillac (2009)
 La Dolce Vita (1960)
 Dolemite (1975)
 Dolemite Is My Name (2019)
 Dolittle (2020)
 The Doll: (1919, 1968, 2008 & 2015)
 Doll Master (2004)
 A Doll's House: (1917, 1918, 1922, 1943, 1956, 1959, 1973 Garland, 1973 Losey & 1992 TV)
 Dollman (1991)
 Dollman vs. Demonic Toys (1993)
 Dolls: (1987, 2002, 2006, 2007 & 2013)
 Dolly Ki Doli (2015)
 Dolores Claiborne (1995)
 Dolphin Tale (2011)
 Dolphin Tale 2 (2014)
 Dolphins (2000)
 Domestic Disturbance (2001)
 The Domestics (2018)
 Dominick and Eugene (1988)
 Dominion: Prequel to the Exorcist (2005)
 Domino: (1988 & 2005)
 The Domino Principle (1977)
 Don: (1978, 2006 Dutch, 2006 Indian, 2007 & 2022)
 Don 2 (2011)
 The Don Is Dead (1973)
 Don Giovanni: (1970 & 1979)
 Don Juan DeMarco (1995)
 Don Jon (2013)
 La donna di notte (1962)
 Don Number One (2012)
 Don Q, Son of Zorro (1925)
 Don Quixote: (1923, 1933, 1957, 1973, 2000 & 2010)
 Don Quixote de la Mancha (1947)
 Don's Party (1976)
 Don's Plum (2001)
 Don't Be Afraid (2011)
 Don't Be Afraid of the Dark: (1973 & 2010)
 Don’t Blink (2014)
 Don't Bother to Knock (1952)
 Don't Breathe: (2014 & 2016)
 Don't Breathe 2 (2021)
 Don't Come Knocking (2005)
 Don't Cry, It's Only Thunder (1982)
 Don't Cry, Nanking (1995)
 Don't Deliver Us from Evil (1971)
 Don't Drink the Water: (1969 & 1994 TV)
 Don't Give Up the Ship (1959)
 Don't Go in the House (1980)
 Don't Go in the Woods: (1981 & 2010)
 Don't Hang Up (2016)
 Don't Knock the Rock (1956)
 Don't Knock Twice (2016)
 Don't Let the Angels Fall (1969)
 Don't Let Go: (2002 & 2019)
 Don’t Listen (2020)
 Don't Look in the Attic (1981)
 Don't Look Back: (1996, 1999 & 2009)
 Don't Look Back: The Story of Leroy 'Satchel' Paige (1981 TV)
 Don't Look Now (1973)
 Don't Look Under the Bed (1999 TV)
 Don't Look Up: (1996 & 2021)
 Don't Lose Your Head (1967)
 Don't Make Waves (1967)
 Don't Be a Menace to South Central While Drinking Your Juice in the Hood (1996)
 Don’t Look (2018)
 Don't Move (2004)
 Don't Open till Christmas (1984)
 Don't Play Us Cheap (1972)
 Don't Raise the Bridge, Lower the River (1968)
 Don't Say a Word (2001)
 Don't Tell Her It's Me (1990)
 Don't Tell Mom the Babysitter's Dead (1991)
 Don't Torture a Duckling (1972)
 Don't Worry Darling (2022)
 Don't Worry, He Won't Get Far on Foot (2018)
 Dona Flor and Her Two Husbands (1976)
 Donald Duck series:
 Donald Gets Drafted (1942)
 Donald in Mathmagic Land (1959)
 Donald's Cousin Gus (1939)
 Donald's Golf Game (1938)
 Donald's Nephews (1938)
 Donbass (2018)
 Dongju: The Portrait of a Poet (2016)
 Donkey Punch (2008)
 Donkey Skin (1970)
 Donkey Xote (2007)
 Donnie Brasco (1997)
 Donnie Darko (2001)
 Donovan's Brain (1953)
 Donovan's Reef (1963)
 Dont Look Back (1967)
 Doodeind (2006)
 Doodlebug (1997)
 Doogal (2006)
 Doom (2005)
 The Doom Generation (1995)
 Doomsday: (1928 & 2008)
 Door to Door (2002 TV)
 The Door in the Floor (2004)
 The Doors (1991)
 Dopamine (2003)
 Doppelgänger (1969)
 Doppelganger: (1993 & 2003)
 Dora and the Lost City of Gold (2019)
 El Dorado: (1921, 1963, 1966 & 1988)
 Doraemon: Nobita's Space Hero Record of Space Heroes (2015)
 Dorf series:
 Dorf Goes Auto Racing (1990)
 Dorf on the Diamond (1996)
 Dorf Goes Fishing (1993)
 Dorf and the First Games of Mount Olympus (1988)
 Dorf on Golf (1987)
 Dorf's Golf Bible (1987)
 Dorian Blues (2004)
 Dorian Gray: (1970 & 2009)
 Dorm (2006)
 The Dorm That Dripped Blood (1983)
 Dorothy and the Witches of Oz (2012)
 Dosti: Friends Forever (2005)
 Dot and the Bunny (1983)
 Dot the I (2003)
 Dot and the Kangaroo (1977)
 Dot and Keeto (1986)
 Dot and the Koala (1985)
 Dot and Santa Claus (1982)
 Dot and the Smugglers (1987)
 Dot in Space (1994)
 Dot and the Whale (1986)
 Dot Goes to Hollywood (1987)
 The Double: (1934, 1971, 2011 & 2013)
 The Double 0 Kid (1992)
 The Double Bed (1965)
 Double Crossbones (1951)
 Double Door (1934)
 Double Dragon (1994)
 Double Exposure: (1944, 1954, 1994 & 2014)
 Double Harness (1933)
 Double Impact (1991)
 Double Indemnity: (1944 & 1973 TV)
 Double Jeopardy: (1955, 1992 TV  & 1999)
 A Double Life: (1924, 1947 & 1954)
 The Double Life of Véronique (1991)
 The Double Man: (1967 & 1976)
 The Double McGuffin (1979)
 Double Suicide: (1918 & 1969)
 Double Suicide: Japanese Summer (1967)
 Double Take: (1998, 2001 & 2009)
 Double Tap (2000)
 Double Team (1997)
 Double Teamed (2002 TV)
 Double Trouble (1967 & 1984)
 Double Vision (1992 & 2002)
 Double Wedding: (1933, 1937 & 2010 TV)
 Double Whammy (2001)
 Double Whoopee (1929)
 Double Xposure (2012)
 Doubles: (2000 & 2011)
 Doubt: (1951, 2003, 2008 & 2009)
 Doubtful (2017)
 Doug's 1st Movie (1999)
 Dough and Dynamite (1914)
 Douglas Fairbanks in Robin Hood (1922)
 Le Doulos (1962)
 Douro, Faina Fluvial (1931)
 The Dove: (1927, 1968 & 1974)
 The Dove's Lost Necklace (1994)
 Down (2001)
 Down Among the Z Men (1952)
 Down a Dark Hall (2018)
 Down in the Delta (1998)
 Down and Derby (2005)
 Down to Earth: (1917, 1932, 1947, 1995 & 2001)
 Down House (2001)
 Down by Law (1986)
 Down with Love (2003)
 Down and Out in Beverly Hills (1986)
 Down Periscope (1996)
 Down to the Sea in Ships (1922 & 1949)
 Down Terrace (2009)
 Down in the Valley (2006)
 Down to You (2000)
 The Downfall (1961)
 Downfall: (1997 & 2004)
 The Downhill (1961)
 Downhill: (1927, 2014, 2016 & 2020)
 Downhill Racer (1969)
 Downloading Nancy (2008)
 Downpour (1971)
 Downrange (2017)
 Downtime (1995)
 Downton Abbey (2019)
 Downton Abbey: A New Era (2022)
 Downtown (1990)
 Downtown 81 (2000)
 Dōbutsu no Mori (2006)

Dr 

 Dr. Akagi (1998)
 Dr. Black, Mr. Hyde (1976)
 Dr. Cyclops (1940)
 Dr. Dolittle series:
 Dr. Dolittle (1998)
 Dr. Dolittle 2 (2001)
 Dr. Dolittle 3 (2005)
 Dr. Dolittle: Million Dollar Mutts (2009)
 Dr. Dolittle: Tail to the Chief (2008)
 Dr. Giggles (1992)
 Dr. Goldfoot and the Girl Bombs (1966)
 Dr. Heckyl and Mr. Hype (1980)
 Dr. Jack (1922)
 Dr. Jekyll and Mr. Hyde: (1908, 1912, 1913, 1920 Haydon, 1920 Paramount, 1931, 1941 & 2002)
 Dr. Jekyll and Ms. Hyde (1995)
 Dr. Jekyll and Sister Hyde (1971)
 Dr. Jekyll y el Hombre Lobo (1972)
 Dr. Mabuse, the Gambler (1922)
 Dr. No (1962)
 Dr. Phibes Rises Again (1972)
 Dr. Seuss' How the Grinch Stole Christmas (2000)
 Dr. Seuss' The Lorax (2012)
 Dr. Strange (1978)
 Dr. Strangelove or: How I Learned to Stop Worrying and Love the Bomb (1964)
 Dr. T & the Women (2000)
 Dr. Terror's House of Horrors (1965)
 Dr. Who and the Daleks (1965)

Dra-Dry

 Dracula: (1931, 1958, 1968, 1979 & 2006 TV)
 Dracula 2000 (2000)
 Dracula 2012 (2013)
 Dracula 3D (2012)
 Dracula 3000 (2004)
 Dracula AD 1972 (1972)
 Dracula vs. Frankenstein (1971)
 Dracula Has Risen from the Grave (1968)
 Dracula in the Provinces (1975)
 Dracula Reborn (2012)
 Dracula and Son (1976)
 Dracula Untold (2014)
 Dracula II: Ascension (2003)
 Dracula III: Legacy (2005)
 Dracula's Daughter (1936)
 Dracula's Death (1921)
 Dracula's Dog (1978)
 Dracula's Widow (1988)
 Dracula: The Dark Prince (2013)
 Dracula: Dead and Loving It (1995)
 Dracula: Pages from a Virgin's Diary (2002)
 Dracula: Prince of Darkness (1966)
 Dracula: Sovereign of The Damned (1980 TV)
 Draft Day (2014)
 Drag Me to Hell (2009)
 The Drag Net (1928)
 Dragged Across Concrete (2018)
 Dragnet: (1947, 1954, & 1987)
 Dragnet Girl (1933)
 Dragon: (2006 & 2011)
 Dragon: The Bruce Lee Story (1993)
 Dragon Ball series:
 Dragon Ball: Curse of the Blood Rubies (1986)
 Dragon Ball: Sleeping Princess in Devil's Castle (1987)
 Dragon Ball: Mystical Adventure (1988)
 Dragon Ball Z: Dead Zone (1989)
 Dragon Ball Z: The World's Strongest (1990)
 Dragon Ball Z: The Tree of Might (1990)
 Dragon Ball Z: Lord Slug (1991)
 Dragon Ball Z: Cooler's Revenge (1991)
 Dragon Ball Z: The Return of Cooler (1992)
 Dragon Ball Z: Super Android 13! (1992)
 Dragon Ball Z: Broly – The Legendary Super Saiyan (1993)
 Dragon Ball Z: Bojack Unbound (1993)
 Dragon Ball Z: Broly – Second Coming (1994)
 Dragon Ball Z: Bio-Broly (1994)
 Dragon Ball Z: Fusion Reborn (1995)
 Dragon Ball Z: Wrath of the Dragon (1995)
 Dragon Ball: The Path to Power (1996)
 Dragonball Evolution (2009)
 Dragon Ball Z: Battle of Gods (2013)
 Dragon Ball Z: Fukkatsu no F (2015)
 Dragon Ball Super: Broly (2018)
 Dragon Ball Super: Super Hero (2022)
 Dragon Blade (2015)
 Dragon Boys (2007 TV)
 Dragon Force (1982)
 Dragon Force: So Long, Ultraman (2017)
 Dragon Inn (1967)
 The Dragon Knight (2011)
 The Dragon Pearl (2011)
 Dragon Princess (1981)
 Dragon Quest: Your Story (2019)
 Dragon Seed (1944)
 Dragon Tiger Gate (2006)
 Dragon Wars: D-War (2007)
 The Dragon's Blood (1957)
 Dragonball Evolution (2009)
 Dragonfly: (1976, 2001 & 2002)
 Dragonheart (1996)
 Dragonheart: A New Beginning (2000)
 Dragonlance: Dragons of Autumn Twilight (2007)
 Dragons Forever (1988)
 Dragonslayer: (1981 & 2011)
 Dragonwyck (1946)
 Drake of England (1935)
 Drama: (2010, 2012 & 2018)
 A Dramatic Night (2015)
 Draug (2018)
 The Draughtsman's Contract (1982)
 Draw! (1984 TV)
 The Drawer Boy (2017)
 Drawing Flies (1996)
 Drawing Restraint 9 (2005)
 Dread (2009)
 Dream: (2008 & 2012)
 The Dream: (1911, 1966, 1985, 1987, 1989)
 Dream Demon (1988)
 The Dream of Garuda (1994)
 Dream Girl: 1948, 1977, 2009 & 2019
 Dream Horse (2020)
 Dream House: (1931 & 2011)
 Dream a Little Dream (1989)
 Dream a Little Dream 2 (1995)
 Dream Machine (1991)
 Dream of the Red Chamber (1944)
 The Dream Team: (1989 & 2012)
 Dream Well (2009)
 Dreamboat (1952)
 Dreamcatcher: (2003, 2015 & 2021)
 Dreamchild (1985)
 Dreamer: (1979 & 2005)
 The Dreamer: (1936, 1965 & 1970)
 The Dreamers (2003)
 Dreamgirls (2006)
 Dreaming: (1944 British & 1944 German)
 The Dreaming (1988)
 Dreaming of Julia (2003)
 Dreaming Machine (unreleased)
 Dreamland: (2006, 2007, 2009, 2016 & 2019)
 The Dreamlife of Angels (1998)
 Dreams: (1955, 1990, 1993, 2004, 2006 & 2016)
 Dreamscape: (1984 & 2007)
 Dreamz (2000)
 Dredd (2012)
 Drei Unteroffiziere (1939)
 Dressed to Kill: (1941, 1946 & 1980)
 The Dresser: (1983 & 2015)
 Drifter (2016)
 Drifting Clouds (1996)
 Drifting Detective: Black Wind in the Harbor (1961)
 Drifting Detective: Tragedy in the Red Valley (1961)
 Driftwood: (1928, 1947, 2006 & 2016)
 Drillbit Taylor (2008)
 The Driller Killer (1979)
 Drinking Buddies (2013)
 Drinking Games (2012)
 Drip-Along Daffy (1951)
 Drive: (1997, 2011 & 2019)
 Drive Angry (2011)
 Drive Me Crazy (1999)
 Drive My Car (2021)
 Drive Thru (2009)
 Drive, He Said (1971)
 Driven: (1916, 1923, 2001 & 2018)
 The Driver (1978)
 The Driver's Seat (1974)
 Drivers Wanted: (2005 & 2012)
 Driveways (2019)
 Driving Lessons (2006)
 Driving Miss Daisy (1989)
 The Drop (2014)
 Drop Dead Fred (1991)
 Drop Dead Gorgeous (1999)
 Drop Zone (1994)
 The Droving (2020)
 Drown (2015)
 The Drowning (2016)
 Drowning Mona (2000)
 Drowning by Numbers (1988)
 The Drowning Pool (1975)
 Drug Scenes (2000)
 Drugstore Cowboy (1989)
 Drugstore Girl (2003)
 Druids (2001)
 Drum: (1976, 2004 & 2016)
 The Drum (1938)
 Drumline (2002)
 Drumline: A New Beat (2014)
 The Drummer (2007)
 Drummer of Vengeance (1971)
 Drums Along the Mohawk (1939)
 Drunk Bus (2020)
 Drunk Stoned Brilliant Dead (2015)
 The Drunkard: (1935, 1937, 1950 & 1953)
 Drunken Angel (1948)
 Drunken Master (1978)
 Drunken Master II (1994)
 Drunken Master III (1994)
 Drunks (1995)
 The Dry (2020)
 Dry Cleaning (1997)
 Dry Summer (1964)
 A Dry White Season (1989)

Du 

 Du Barry Was a Lady (1943)
 Dual: (2008 & 2022)
 The Duchess (2008)
 Duchess of Idaho (1950)
 Duck Amuck (1953)
 Duck Butter (2018)
 Duck and Cover (1951)
 Duck Dodgers in the 24½th Century (1953)
 Duck Soup: (1927 & 1933)
 Duck Soup to Nuts (1944)
 Duck! The Carbine High Massacre (1999)
 Duck! Rabbit, Duck! (1953)
 DuckTales the Movie: Treasure of the Lost Lamp (1990)
 Duckweed (2014)
 Duct Tape Forever (2002)
 Dude (2018)
 Dudes (1987)
 Dude, Where's My Car? (2000)
 Dude, Where's the Party? (2003)
 Dudley Do-Right (1999)
 Dudu, a Human Destiny (1924)
 Due Date (2010)
 Duel: (1971 & 2004)
 Duel to the Death (1983)
 Duel at Diablo (1966)
 Duel at Ganryu Island (1956)
 Duel at Ichijoji Temple (1955)
 Duel in the Sun (1946)
 The Duellists (1977)
 Duet: (1994, 2006 & 2014)
 Duet for One (1986)
 Duets (2000)
 The DUFF (2015)
 The Duke: (1998, 1999 & 2020)
 The Duke of Burgundy (2014)
 The Dukes (2007)
 The Dukes of Hazzard (2005)
 The Dukes of Hazzard: The Beginning (2007) (TV)
 The Dukes of Hazzard: Hazzard in Hollywood (2000) (TV)
 The Dukes of Hazzard: Reunion! (1997) (TV)
 Dulari (1949)
 Duma: (2005 & 2011)
 Dumb & Dumberer: When Harry Met Lloyd (2003)
 Dumb and Dumber (1994)
 Dumb and Dumber To (2014)
 Dumbbells (2014)
 Dumbo: (1941 & 2019)
 Dumm Dumm Dumm (2001)
 Dummy: (1979 TV & 2002)
 The Dummy: (1917 & 1929)
 The Dummy Talks (1943)
 Dumplin' (2018)
 Dumplings (2004)
 Dune: (1984 & 2021)
 Dune: Part Two (2023)
 Dungeons & Dragons series:
 Dungeons & Dragons (2000)
 Dungeons & Dragons: Wrath of the Dragon God (2005)
 Dungeons & Dragons 3: The Book of Vile Darkness (2012)
 Dungeons & Dragons: Honor Among Thieves (2023)
 Dunkirk: (1958 & 2017)
 Dunston Checks In (1996)
 The Dunwich Horror (1970)
 Dünyayı Kurtaran Adam (1982)
 Duplex (2003)
 Duplicate: (1998 & 2009)
 Duplicity (2009)
 Dust: (1985, 2001, 2005, 2009 & 2012)
 Dust Bowl Ha! Ha! (2007)
 Dust Devil (1992)
 Dutch (1991)
 Dutchman (1967)

Dv-Dz 

 Dva ohně (1949)
 Dvořák - In Love? (1988)
 Dwaar (2013)
 Dwandha Yudham (1981)
 Dwando (2009)
 Dwaraka (2017)
 Dweepa (2002)
 Dweepu (1977)
 Dweller (2002)
 Dwellers (2021)
 Dwitiyo Purush (2020)
 The Dybbuk (1937)
 Dybt vand (1999)
 Dying to Be Me (2015)
 Dying to Belong (1997 TV)
 Dying Breed (2008)
 Dying Candle (2016)
 Dying to Do Letterman (2011)
 Dying God (2008)
 Dying for Gold (2018)
 Dying at Grace (2003)
 Dying of Laughter (1999)
 Dying of the Light (2014)
 Dying to Live: (2008 & 2018)
 Dying to Remember (1993)
 Dying Room Only (1973 TV)
 Dying to Survive (2018)
 Dying to Tell (2018)
 Dying Young (1991)
 Dykes, Camera, Action! (2018)
 Dylan Dog: Dead of Night (2011)
 Dylan Thomas (1962)
 Dynamite: (1929, 1949 & 2015)
 Dynamite Allen (1921)
 Dynamite Brothers (1974)
 Dynamite Canyon (1941)
 Dynamite Chicken (1972)
 Dynamite Dan (1924)
 Dynamite Denny (1932)
 Dynamite Jack (1961)
 Dynamite Pass (1950)
 Dynamite Ranch (1932)
 Dynamite Smith (1924)
 Dynamite Warrior (2006)
 Dynasty (1976 TV)
 Dynasty Warriors (2021)
 Dzięcioł (1971)

Previous:  List of films: C    Next:  List of films: E

See also 

 Lists of films
 Lists of actors
 List of film and television directors
 List of documentary films
 List of film production companies

-